Şahinbey  is a district of Gaziantep Province of Turkey. It was named after Şahin Bey (1877-1920), a Turkish National Movement commander. It is part of Gaziantep Metropolitan municipality. The population is 730,562 as of 2010.  It is the location of a large amount of student housing for the public University of Gaziantep, as well as the site of two private universities: Zirve and Hasan Kalyoncu.

References

Districts of Gaziantep Province